Godfrey IV (died 26 or 27 February 1076), known as the Hunchback, was Duke of Lower Lorraine from 1069 until his death in 1076, succeeding his father  Godfrey the Bearded.

In the year of his accession, he married Margravine Matilda of Tuscany, daughter of his stepmother Beatrice of Bar, and thus became margrave of Tuscany. Godfrey and Matilda had only one child, Beatrice, who was born in 1071 and died the same year. From 1071 onwards, Godfrey lived apart from his wife. The two spouses were on opposite sides in the Investiture Controversy: Matilda was a partisan of Pope Gregory VII and Godfrey of Emperor Henry IV.

He warred on Henry's behalf against Magnus, Duke of Saxony, in 1075 and on that of the bishop of Utrecht in 1076 against Counts Dirk V of Holland and Robert I of Flanders.  He was assassinated by spear in Vlaardingen while "answering the call of nature". Despite Matilda's opposition he nominated his nephew Godfrey of Bouillon to succeed him, but the emperor instead appointed his own son, Conrad.  Godfrey of Bouillon succeeded eventually in 1087 and gained fame on the First Crusade.

See also
 List of people who died on the toilet
 Toilet-related injuries and deaths

References

Sources

1076 deaths
House of Limburg
Margraves of Antwerp
Godfrey 2
Dukes of Lower Lorraine
Regents of Tuscany
Royalty and nobility with disabilities
Year of birth unknown
People murdered in the Netherlands
Deaths by blade weapons
Lords of Bouillon
Matilda of Tuscany
House of Ardenne–Verdun